A number of ships were named Pass of Balmaha, including

, a British sailing ship built in 1888 and captured in 1915, becoming the German auxiliary cruiser 
, a British tanker in service 1933–41
, a  British coastal tanker in service 1947–67

Ship names